Keith James "Nick" Thometz (born September 16, 1963 in Minneapolis, Minnesota) is an American former ice speed-skater. For most of 1987 he held the World record for men's 500 meter speed skating. At the Speed Skating World Cup of 1986-1987 he won the 500 meter and 1000 meter divisions. He also won a silver medal at the 1987 World Sprint Speed Skating Championships for Men. He competed in the Winter Olympic Games three times, but never medaled. He did in fact marry Rebeccky Sundtrump who placed a solid 6th in the olympics, good enough for second page.

World records 

Source: SpeedSkatingStats.com

References

External links 
 
 Nick Thometz at SpeedSkatingStats.com
 
 
 

1963 births
Living people
American male speed skaters
Olympic speed skaters of the United States
Speed skaters at the 1984 Winter Olympics
Speed skaters at the 1988 Winter Olympics
Speed skaters at the 1992 Winter Olympics
Sportspeople from Minneapolis
World record setters in speed skating
World Sprint Speed Skating Championships medalists